A Specially Designated Global Terrorist (SDGT) is a person or entity that has been designated as such by the United States Department of State or the US Department of the Treasury. An SDGT designation is made under authority of US Executive Order 13224 of September 23, 2001, as amended by Executive Order 13268 of July 2, 2002, and Executive Order 13284 of January 23, 2003, and Title 31, Parts 595, 596, and 597 of the US Code of Federal Regulations, among other US laws and regulations. The main regulatory framework underlying the SDGT designation was established two weeks after the September 11 attacks in 2001 by US President George W. Bush.

One of the first organisations to which Executive Order 13224 was applied was the Palestinian-American charity the Holy Land Foundation for Relief and Development. Its offices were raided on 4 December 2001, its assets were seized and the organisation closed. The HLF was the largest Muslim charity in the United States, collecting £13,000,000 in donations in 2000. 

SDGTs are entities and individuals who the Office of Foreign Assets Control (OFAC) finds have committed or pose a significant risk of committing acts of terrorism, or who OFAC finds provide support, services, or assistance to, or otherwise associate with, terrorists and terrorist organizations designated under OFAC Counter Terrorism Sanctions programs, as well as related persons, subsidiaries, front organizations, agents, or associates. They are designated under OFAC's programs.

The designation SDGT is one of several types of designations of persons to whom one or more OFAC-administered sanctions apply; these include country-specific and counter narcotics trafficking, non-proliferation, and transnational criminal organization-related sanctions, and potentially under sanctions related to illicit trading in rough diamonds, although this had not been applied of early November 2011.

OFAC publishes an integrated list of persons designated under its various sanctions programs that is known as the Specially Designated Nationals List, under which SDGT listings are included. Individuals and companies designated as "Specially Designated Nationals" are known as "SDNs". Most SDGT SDNs are foreign persons, but in at least one case—that of the late Anwar al-Awlaki (also known by various aliases)—an American citizen was designated as an SDGT.

To avoid designated persons or entities transferring funds out of the jurisdiction or otherwise rendering a determination ineffective, section 10 of Executive Order 13224 authorises the dispensing of prior notice of the determination to the persons subject to a determination.

See also
 List of designated terrorist groups
 Specially Designated Terrorist

References

External links
 FBI Most Wanted Terrorist list
 National Counterterrorism Center Designated Foreign Terrorist Organizations
 State Department: Patterns of Global Terrorism
 National Counterterrorism Center Terrorist Exclusion List
 State Department is offering up to $25 million for information about key terrorists
 Executive Order on Terrorist Financing: Blocking Property and Prohibiting Transactions With Persons Who Commit, Threaten to Commit, or Support Terrorism, White House, September 24, 2001
 US Department of Treasury Office of Foreign Assets Control
 List of sanctions programs including nations

13224
2001 in American law
International sanctions
Global
Counterterrorism in the United States